A sister republic was a republic established by French armies or by local revolutionaries and assisted by the First French Republic during the French Revolutionary Wars. These republics, though nominally independent, relied heavily on France for protection, making them more akin to autonomous territories rather than independent states. This became particularly evident after the declaration of the French Empire, when several states were annexed, and the remaining turned into monarchies ruled by members of the Bonaparte family.

History
The French Revolution was a period of social and political upheaval in France from 1789 until 1799. The Republicans who overthrew the monarchy were driven by ideas of popular sovereignty, rule of law and representative democracy. The Republicans borrowed ideas and values from Whiggism and Enlightenment philosophers. The French Republic supported the spread of republican principles in Europe, but most of these sister republics became a means of controlling occupied lands as client regimes through a mix of French and local power.

Sister republics of Italy 
 Subalpine Republic (1800–1802) annexed to the French Republic
 Piedmontese Republic (1798–1799), conquered by Austro-Russian troops and rendered back to Sardinia, but reconquered by Napoleon in 1800 and renamed Subalpine Republic (Novara to the Italian Republic)
 Republic of Alba (1796) reconquered by the Kingdom of Sardinia
 Parthenopean Republic (1799) reconquered by the Sanfedisti for the King of Naples and Sicily
 Republic of Pescara (1799) re-united with the Kingdom of Naples
 Roman Republic (1798–1799) ended with the restoration of the Papal States
 Anconine Republic (1797–1798) joined Roman Republic
 Tiberina Republic (1798–1799) joined Roman Republic
 Ligurian Republic (1797–1805) annexed to the French Empire
 Republic of Lucca (1799 and 1800–01), later continued (1801–05) under the old oligarchy and it was replaced by the Principality of Lucca and Piombino
 Italian Republic (1802–1805) transformed into the Kingdom of Italy
 Cisalpine Republic (1797–1802) transformed into the Italian Republic
 Cispadane Republic (1796–1797) formed the Cisalpine Republic
Bolognese Republic (1796) annexed to the Cispadane Republic
 Transpadane Republic (1796–1797) formed the Cisalpine Republic
 Republic of Crema (1797) formed the Cisalpine Republic
Republic of Bergamo (1797) formed the Cisalpine Republic
Republic of Brescia (1797) annexed to the Cisalpine Republic

Other sister republics 

 Republic of Bouillon (1794–1795)
 Republic of Liège (1789–1791)
 Rauracian Republic (1792–1793) revolutionary French republic in Basel 
 Lémanique Republic (1798) joined the Helvetic Republic
 Republic of Mainz (1793) revolutionary French republic in Rhenish Hesse and the Electoral Palatinate 
 Batavian Republic (1795–1806) Netherlands
 Cisrhenian Republic (1797) Germany
 Republic of Connacht (1798) accompanied Humbert's Irish expedition in support of the Irish Rebellion of 1798
 Helvetic Republic (1798–1803) Switzerland
 Republic of Danzig (1807–1814)
 Rhodanic Republic (1802–1810) (Valais)

References

 Republicanism
 Modern history of Italy
 
French Directory